Katy Louise Sealy (born 15 October 1990) is a Belizean international athlete. She was brought up in Suffolk in England but qualifies for Belize because her father was born there. She lived in Bawdsey.

Sealy was a heptathlete at the 2014 Commonwealth Games in Glasgow and carried the flag for Belize. She also competed as a heptathlete at the 2018 Commonwealth Games in the Gold Coast, Australia.

Despite being a previous Central American heptathlon champion, she failed to qualify for the heptathlon at the 2016 Summer Olympics in Rio de Janeiro. Sealy was however given a wildcard for the 100 metres hurdles which she competed in, finishing 7th in Heat 1. She has set a number of Belizean athletic records, including indoor 800 metres, high jump, and javelin throw.

References

External links
 

1990 births
Living people
Sportspeople from Ipswich
English people of Belizean descent
Belizean people of British descent
People with acquired Belizean citizenship
Athletes (track and field) at the 2014 Commonwealth Games
Commonwealth Games competitors for Belize
Athletes (track and field) at the 2016 Summer Olympics
Olympic athletes of Belize
Belizean female hurdlers
English female hurdlers
Athletes (track and field) at the 2018 Commonwealth Games
Central American Games silver medalists for Belize
Central American Games medalists in athletics